Doig is a surname originating from Scotland. This is an anglicised form of the Olde Scots Gaelic name Mac Gille Doig - a compound of the elements "mac" meaning "son of", "gille", a servant, plus the personal name Doig, a short form of Cadog. The name therefore translates as "son of St. Cadog's servant".  In Scotland, the name appears most often on record in places where St Cadog was commemorated. The name was first recorded in the latter half of the 14th century as "Dog'. The spelling 'Doig' appears in the 17th century. Other modern variants of the name are Doag, Doeg, Doak, and Doidge. 

Notable people with the surname include:
Andrew W. Doig (1799-1875), American politician
Alison Harcourt (born 1929 as Alison Doig), Australian mathematician and statistician
Anna Doig (born 1965), New Zealand swimmer
Charles C Doig (1855-1918), British architect
Chris Doig (born 1981), Scottish footballer
Chris Doig (1949-2011), New Zealand opera singer
Clive Doig (born 1940), British television producer
Dale Doig (1935-2022), American politicians, mayor of Fresno, California
Edna Nell Doig (1915-1988), Australian army matron-in-chief
Federico Kauffmann Doig (21st century), Peruvian historian
George Doig (1913-2006), Australian rules footballer
Ivan Doig (1939-2015), American novelist
Jack Doig (1872-1951), New Zealand cricketer
Jason Doig (born 1977), Canadian ice hockey player
Josh Doig (born 2002), Scottish footballer
Keith Doig (born 1891), Australian rules footballer
Lexa Doig (born 1973), Canadian actress
Mel Doig (died 1998), Canadian politician
Ned Doig (1866-1919), Scottish footballer
Neil Doig (born 1982), Author of Millennial Money Mindset
Norm Doig (1910-2001), Australian rules footballer
Peter Doig (born 1959), Scottish painter
Peter Doig (politician) (1911-1996), British Labour Party politician
Ron Doig Sr. (1909-1932), Australian sportsman
Russell Doig (born 1964), Scottish footballer
Steve Doig (born 1960), American football player

References

Citations

Bibliography 
 

Scottish surnames